Clifton Field was an airfield operational in the early-20th century in Wellfleet, Massachusetts.

References

Defunct airports in Massachusetts
Airports in Barnstable County, Massachusetts
Wellfleet, Massachusetts